Arnold Vesterberg (14 December 1878 Tallinn - ? (is known that emigrated to USA)) was an Estonian politician. He was a member of Estonian Constituent Assembly.

References

1878 births
Members of the Estonian Constituent Assembly
Year of death missing
Estonian emigrants to the United States